Couhé is a former commune in the Vienne department in the Nouvelle-Aquitaine region in western France. On 1 January 2019, it was merged into the new commune Valence-en-Poitou. The neo-impressionist painter Édouard de Bergevin (1861–1925) was born in Couhé.

See also
Communes of the Vienne department

References

External links

 Tourism office

Former communes of Vienne